The dark-backed sibia (Heterophasia melanoleuca) is a bird species in the family Leiothrichidae. In former times it was included the black-headed sibia, H. desgodinsi. Together with most other sibias, it is sometimes separated in the genus Malacias.  It is found in China, Myanmar and Thailand. Its natural habitat is subtropical or tropical moist montane forests.

References

Collar, N. J. & Robson C. 2007. Family Timaliidae (Babblers)  pp. 70 – 291 in; del Hoyo, J., Elliott, A. & Christie, D.A. eds. Handbook of the Birds of the World, Vol. 12. Picathartes to Tits and Chickadees. Lynx Edicions, Barcelona.

External links
Images at ADW

dark-backed sibia
Birds of Myanmar
Birds of Thailand
Birds of Laos
dark-backed sibia
dark-backed sibia